HMS Tuscan was a T-class destroyer of the British Royal Navy that served during the Second World War and was scrapped in 1966.

Second World War service
On 7 October 1944, she and the destroyer  sank the German torpedo boat TA37, the subchaser UJ210 and the harbour patrol boat GK32.

Post-war service
Between 1946 and 1952, Tuscan was held as part of the reserve fleet in Portsmouth. In 1949 and 1950, she had a refit at Cammell Laird in Birkenhead. Between May 1952 and September 1953, she was converted into a Type 16 fast anti-submarine frigate by Mount Stuart Dry Docks, Cardiff and was allocated the new pennant number F156.

In 1953, she was held as part of the Devonport Reserve, and in 1954 the Portsmouth Reserve. In 1960, she was part of the Chatham reserve and between 1961 and 1963 was part of the Portsmouth Operational Reserve. She was eventually sold to McLellan for scrap and arrived at Bo'ness for breaking up on 26 March 1966.

References

Publications

External links
 Naval-History.net HMS Tuscan

 

S and T-class destroyers
Ships built on the River Tyne
1942 ships
World War II destroyers of the United Kingdom
Cold War destroyers of the United Kingdom
Type 16 frigates
Cold War frigates of the United Kingdom